Marcus Burghardt (born 30 June 1983) is a German former professional road bicycle racer, who rode professionally between 2005 and 2021 for the ,  and  teams. During his career, Burghardt took seven professional victories, including the 2007 Gent–Wevelgem, the German National Road Race Championships in 2017, and a stage win at the 2008 Tour de France.

Career
Burghardt was born in Zschopau, Saxony, and raced as an amateur in the U-23 Wiesenhof team, with which he tasted success in the shape of the overall win at the Bundesliga Gerlingen in 2004. Burghardt turned professional in 2005, and won the UCI ProTour race Gent–Wevelgem in 2007, ahead of teammate Roger Hammond. He has also performed well in some races such as the Dwars door Vlaanderen and some stages of the Vuelta a España.

He was successful in winning Stage 18 of the 2008 Tour de France into Saint Etienne, beating break-away compatriot Carlos Barredo.

After seven years there, in August 2016  announced that he would join them for 2017. He remained with the team for five seasons, with his sole victory coming in the German National Road Race Championships in 2017.

In April 2022, he announced his retirement from professional cycling, while rehabilitating from a severe wrist injury suffered at the 2021 Tour de Pologne. In June 2022, he joined the executive committee of the German Cycling Federation.

Major results

Source: 

2001
 1st  Overall Trofeo Karlsberg
1st Stages 1 & 5
 9th Road race, UCI Junior Road World Championships
2003
 10th Overall Ronde de l'Isard
1st Stage 3
2004
 4th Paris–Roubaix Espoirs
 8th Overall Le Triptyque des Monts et Châteaux
 10th Overall Giro delle Regioni
2005
 4th Dwars door Vlaanderen
2006
 7th Dwars door Vlaanderen
2007
 1st Gent–Wevelgem
 3rd E3 Prijs Vlaanderen
 6th Overall 3-Länder-Tour
1st Stages 3 & 5
 6th Trofeo Cala Millor-Cala Bona
 2008
 Tour de France
1st Stage 18
 Combativity award Stage 18
2009
 4th Overall Sachsen Tour
 5th Omloop Het Nieuwsblad
 7th Tour of Flanders
 7th Gent–Wevelgem
 10th E3 Prijs Vlaanderen
2010
 Tour de Suisse
1st  Points classification
1st Stages 5 & 7
 5th Overall Tour of Qatar
 7th Overall Tour of Oman
2011
 9th Overall Tour of Qatar
2013
 1st  Mountains classification, Tour de Romandie
2015
 1st Stage 1 (TTT) Vuelta a España
 3rd Road race, National Road Championships
2017
 1st  Road race, National Road Championships
2018
 10th Omloop Het Nieuwsblad
2019
 2nd Road race, National Road Championships
2021
 5th Road race, National Road Championships

Grand Tour general classification results timeline

References

External links

Marcus Burghardt's blog 

Strava Profile

1983 births
Living people
People from Zschopau
German male cyclists
German Tour de France stage winners
Tour de Suisse stage winners
Cyclists from Saxony
People from Bezirk Karl-Marx-Stadt